The Meredith Publishing Company, a division of Meredith Corporation, purchased D. Appleton & Company in 1960 [probably that is the Appleton grandchild Appleton-Century-Crofts, created 1948], and Duell, Sloan and Pearce in 1961.
It later sold off various divisions of both to Academic Learning Company, LLC and Prentice Hall.

Book publishing companies of the United States